Almak is a rural locality (a selo) in Kazbekovsky District, Republic of Dagestan, Russia. The population was 1,983 as of 2010. There are 40 streets.

Geography 
Almak is located on the right bank of the Aktash River, 20 km southwest of Dylym (the district's administrative centre) by road. Burtunay is the nearest rural locality.

Nationalities 
Avars live there.

References 

Rural localities in Kazbekovsky District